Bruce Patterson may refer to:
 Bruce Patterson (cricketer) (born 1965), Scottish cricketer
 Bruce Patterson (politician) (born 1947), Republican member of the Michigan Senate
 Bruce Patterson (officer of arms) (born 1967), Canadian officer of arms at the Canadian Heraldic Authority
 Bruce D. Patterson, author of the 2004 book The Lions of Tsavo: Exploring the Legacy of Africa's Notorious Man-Eaters